Avenue U is a street in Brooklyn, New York City.

It may also refer to:
Other streets named Avenue U in other cities

Several subway stations of the New York City Subway in Brooklyn:
Avenue U (BMT Sea Beach Line), serving the 
Avenue U (IND Culver Line), serving the 
Avenue U (BMT Brighton Line), serving the

See also
 U Street (disambiguation)
 University Avenue (disambiguation)